Cuauhtémoc Sandoval Ramírez (14 August 195022 February 2012) was a Mexican politician, social anthropologist and founding member of the Party of the Democratic Revolution (PRD). He was twice elected as a federal deputy and once a Senator. He served in the Mexican congress as Secretary of Foreign Relations, a member of the National Defense Committee and he is on the Population, Borders and Immigration Issues committee.
Cuauhtémoc Sandoval Ramírez was the son of Pablo Sandoval Cruz, a distinguished politician in the State of Guerrero (Mexico). He had a degree in Social Anthropology, and was a founding member of the PRD. He is survived by two sons, Ernesto Sandoval Pastrana and Cuauhtémoc Sandoval Pastrana.

References

1950 births
2012 deaths
Party of the Democratic Revolution politicians
Members of the Chamber of Deputies (Mexico)
Members of the Senate of the Republic (Mexico)
Place of birth missing
Place of death missing
20th-century Mexican politicians
21st-century Mexican politicians